Let's Stay Together is an album by American jazz organist Jimmy McGriff featuring performances recorded in 1966 and 1972 and released on the Groove Merchant label.

Reception 

Allmusic's Stephen Cook said: "Let's Stay Together is a great set by one of the masters of the Hammond B-3 organ sound". On All About Jazz Douglas Payne noted "The music, unfortunately, isn't terribly memorable. But the R&B covers benefit by McGriff's outstanding blues touch and the funky "Tiki" and the glorious blues of "Old Grand Dad" (the only originals) are what make a McGriff album worth every dollar. Although nothing too surprising happens here, McGriff fans will want to pick up on this cut-out classic"

Track listing
 "Let's Stay Together" (Al Green, Willie Mitchell, Al Jackson Jr.) – 2:45
 "Tiki" (Jimmy McGriff) – 4:20
 "Theme from Shaft" (Isaac Hayes) – 4:00
 "What's Going On" (Marvin Gaye, Renaldo Benson, Al Cleveland) – 4:33
 "Old Grand Dad" (McGriff, Thornel Schwartz) – 5:04
 "Georgia on My Mind" (Hoagy Carmichael, Stuart Gorrell) – 6:42
 "April in Paris" (Vernon Duke, Yip Harburg) – 5:03

Personnel
Jimmy McGriff – organ
William Skinner – trumpet (tracks 1–4)
L. E. Lofton – trombone (tracks 1–4)
Harold (Sampson) Bennett – tenor saxophone, flute (tracks 1–4)
Lawrence Frazier (tracks 1–4), Thornel Schwartz (tracks 5–7) – guitar
Willie Jenkins – drums
James Peacock – congas (tracks 1–4)

References

Groove Merchant albums
Jimmy McGriff albums
1972 albums
Albums produced by Sonny Lester